Cherries jubilee is a dessert dish made with cherries and liqueur (typically kirschwasser), which are flambéed tableside, and commonly served as a sauce over vanilla ice cream.

The recipe is generally credited to Auguste Escoffier, who prepared the dish for one of Queen Victoria's Jubilee celebrations, widely thought to be the Diamond Jubilee in 1897.

Similar dishes
Other flambéed fruit dishes include Bananas Foster, mangos diablo (mangos flambéed in tequila) and pêches Louis (peaches flamed in whiskey).

See also

 List of cherry dishes
 List of desserts
 List of fruit dishes

References

External links
 

British desserts
Jubilee
Flambéed foods
Ice cream